In political science, voter apathy is a lack of interest among voters in the elections of representative democracies. Voter apathy or lack of interest is often cited as a cause of low turnout among eligible voters in jurisdictions where voting is optional, and the donkey vote where voting is compulsory. This phenomenon occurs to some extent across all countries or entities where citizens are able to vote. Voter apathy has led to increased concerns regarding representative democracies because election results do not encompass the entire population who are eligible to vote. Voter fatigue describes a possible cause of voter apathy, which are elections that are held too frequently.

Political alienation may be confused with voter apathy. Sometimes, alienated voters do care about an election, but feel "estranged or disaffected from the system or somehow left out of the political process."

Background
The psychological factors that influence voter behavior are a voter's perceptions of politics, that is, how the voter sees the parties, the candidates, and the issues in an election. 
The farther down the ballot an office is, the fewer the number of votes that will be cast for it. This is called ballot fatigue. The expression suggests that many voters exhaust their patience or knowledge as they work their way down the ballot.

Prominent Founding Fathers writing in The Federalist Papers believed it was "essential to liberty that the government in general should have a common interest with the people," and felt that a bond between the people and the representatives was "particularly essential." They wrote "frequent elections are unquestionably the only policy by which this dependence and sympathy can be effectually secured." In 2009, however, few Americans were familiar with leaders of Congress.

In the 19th century there was a substantially large amount of voter turnout with numerous years with over 80% participation. This was due to several factors. One, political machines gave voters an incredible incentive to vote with favors of work, wealth, and political power (which were especially attractive to poor immigrants); however, political machines lost much of their power with the increased ability to vote and with more exposure on corrupt policies.

Numerous reports suggest voter apathy is widespread and growing. The percentage of Americans eligible to vote who did, in fact, vote was 63% in 1960, but has been falling since.

Vanderbilt professor Dana D. Nelson in Bad for Democracy argues that all citizens seem to do, politically, is vote for president every four years, and not much else; they've abandoned politics. Apathy was lower in the 2008 election, which featured a competitive election for president. Voter turnout in 2008 (62%) was the highest since 1968.

On the other hand, Hunter College professor Jamie Chandler claims that voter apathy, or a lack of interest in the political system, is overstated in regards to socioeconomic factors. Wealth and educational attainment correlate most strongly with voter participation.

Civic technology 
Civic technology seeks to counteract the effects of voter apathy through more modern means, such as social media, applications, and websites. Many startups within the field of civic technology attempt to connect voters to politicians and government, in an attempt to boost voter participation and turnout. Examples include and mySociety in the United Kingdom. A John S. and James L. Knight Foundation report found that $431 million had been invested in civic technology from January 2011 through May 2013, with $4 million specifically invested in voting technologies.

For the 2016 US Presidential election, Facebook implemented reminders to register to vote in its social network. Several election officials have claimed that these efforts significantly increased voter registration.

Regional voter apathy

Voter apathy in the United States
According to the Pew Research Center, only 55.7 percent of the U.S. voting age population cast ballots in the 2016 presidential election. This percentage is a slight increase from the 2012 election, but lower than the 2008 election, which had record numbers. Voter turnout numbers in the United States are quite low compared to other developed nations. The United States was ranked 31 out of the 35 countries in this study. The Census Bureau recorded that there were roughly 245.5 million Americans who were eligible to vote, but only 157.6 million of eligible voters were registered to vote. The United States Election Project had similar findings, estimating apathy slightly higher: 46.9 percent of eligible voters did not vote in 2016. Many Americans do not take the effort to learn the voting process, as some see it as a burden.

There is an overemphasis on the number of Americans who have claimed they voted. The Clerk of the U.S. House of Representatives only recorded 136.8 million people, compared to the 137.5 million who claimed to have voted. This number also includes 170,000 ballots which were blank, spoiled, or null.

Voter registration in the United States is an independent responsibility, so citizens are able to choose whether they want to register or not. This led to only 64% of the voting age population being registered to vote in 2016. The United States is one of the sole countries that requires its citizens to register separately from voting. The lack of automatic registration contributes to the issue that there are over a third of eligible citizen in the United States that are not registered to vote.

Since 1976, voter turnout has stayed between an 8.5 percent range of fluctuation and has been on a historical downward trend, although there are differences among certain racial, ethnic, and age groups. Turnout has been lingering between 48% and 57% since 1980.

Voters between 45 and 65 year old and voters over 65 years old have the highest rate of voter turnout. In the time span from 1964 to 2004, 18-24 year olds usually had a voter turnout of 41.8%, compared to 25-44 year olds who had a turnout of 57.9%. Voters between 45 and 65 year old and voters over 65 years old have turnout rates of 69.3% and 66.6% respectively. Younger age groups are typically underrepresented in proportion; the greatest percentage of unregistered voters is in the 18-30 year old age group. People in younger age demographics are speculated to be more focused on other aspects in their life, such as college, marriage, and careers. In turn, younger demographics are less likely to learn about politics or understand the implications behind voting. Voters tend to be older, wealthier, and more educated than non-voters.

In a USA Today poll taken in 2012, 59 percent of citizens who chose not to vote because they believed that "'nothing ever gets done' in government". Another 54% of non-voters believed there is government corruption. Thirty seven percent explicitly stated that politics did not make any difference in their lives.

Certain voters are likely to refrain from elections due to their lack of interest in the available political stances. When the wishes of citizens are not properly addressed in government, voters are more likely to become uninterested in the democratic process. One reason for low turnout rates during primaries is due to the apathy regarding who will make it to the general election. Many individuals further believe only the general election in the United States is important. Congressional elections are also prone to voter apathy. This leads candidates chosen out of  increasingly polarized voter pools, which heighten rigidness and gridlock in the government. There is generally an inverse relationship between level of government and turnout rates.

Voter apathy in the European Union 
Member-states in the European Union are able to vote in two ways. Voters are allowed to vote in elections within their own countries as well as in elections concerning the European Union through the European Parliament. Voter apathy is seen in the European Union through elections within each country and within the European Parliament.

European Parliament elections are when individuals in EU member-states vote for matters concerning the entirety of the European Union through electing a representative from their country into the European Parliament. It is noted that turnout is frequently lower in such elections compared to national elections. Voter apathy is speculated because individuals within the European Parliament often perceive such elections to hold low salience context.. In such cases, individuals believe that there are less personal stakes attached to elections in the European Parliament. As such, such attitudes further imply that voters perceive such elections to be less important than national elections.

Another line of reasoning suggests that individuals may be dissatisfied with party positions within the European Parliament, especially regarding the subject of European integration. Research shows that the larger the distance between voters and their national party choices in the European Union, the more likely that they will abstain from voting in the European Parliament election. Hence, voter apathy is a phenomenon that heavily impacts the turnout of European Parliament elections. However, in recent years, it is observed that increased politicization within the European Union has led to increased voter turnout. In 2019, 50.66 percent of EU members voted in the European Parliament election, increasing from 42.61 in 2014. Speculated reasons for this increase are pertaining to Brexit, the Migrant Crisis, climate change policy, and rising concern over anti-EU sentiment ..

Voter apathy in Canada 
Canada's voter turnout has remained relatively high compared to other developed democracies. In 2019, the share of the voting-age population registered to vote is around 93 percent. In the 2019 federal election, 77 percent of eligible voters reported that they had cast a ballot. However, one study highlights that the primary reason individuals abstained from voting inn 2019 is due to a lack of interest in politics, at 35 percent, followed by 22 percent of non-voters who indicated that they were busy. The majority of non-voters were younger voters aged 18 to 24. Furthermore, Canadians who were citizens by birth reported lower voter turnout than naturalized citizens or immigrants in Canada; this may be due to the fact that individuals from foreign countries are more appreciative of the democratic process. Overall, voter turnout has remained steady within the past decade.

Causes 
There are two primary causes for voter apathy: alienation and voter fatigue.

Alienation is defined as, “this refers to the sense that voters feel like the political system does not work for them and any attempt to influence it will be a fruitless exercise.” This could be due to many factors. One of the reasons is due to lack of education. According to a study done by Kei Kawashima-Ginsberg, the director of CIRCLE, found that nearly 20% of youth did not feel that they knew enough to vote. Additionally, the study found that many youth had glaring misconceptions about the voting process with many several in the study thinking that they could not vote due to relatively minor violations (like driving under the influence). This 20% is especially significant when juxtaposed with the 20% total youth turnout in the 2018 midterms.

Voter fatigue is defined in political science as, “voter fatigue is the apathy that the electorate can experience under certain circumstances, one of which could be that they are required to vote too often.” One of the possible causes for voter fatigue is the barrage of political messages through the internet (especially social media). With the large amount of exposure to political messages year-round can cause a fatigue that turns potential voters away from the voting process.

Along with those two main causes, voter apathy can be caused by being uncomfortable with the possible choices, being unable to vote due to legal or logistical barriers, being overwhelmed by personal issues, or encountering registration problems.

Possible Solutions 
One of the possible solutions to voter apathy in the younger generation is increased education.

Multiple studies have shown that decreased civic instruction starting in the 1960s has led to decreased young voter turnout. In 2014, there was a record-low turnout of adults 18–29 with 20% casting a ballot. In 2018, only nine states required at least one year of government or civic education. According to a 2018 survey by the Woodrow Wilson National Fellowship Foundation, only one third of Americans could pass a general citizenship test, 13% of young Americans knew when the Constitution was ratified, and less than 50% could identify which countries the United States fought in World War 2. According to the Tuft study, this has led 20% of young adults to avoid voting due to not knowing enough information to cast a ballot.

See also
 Apoliticism
 Political alienation
 Swing vote

References

Elections
Youth politics
Voting theory